Jason Bloom (born September 4, 1982, in Coquitlam, British Columbia) is a lacrosse player on the Washington Stealth of the National Lacrosse League. He also played for Coquitlam Adanacs of the Western Lacrosse Association in the summer of 2006.

College career
Bloom earned a psychology degree from Ohio State University, where he captained the Buckeyes in 2004 and 2005. He was a four-time Ohio State Scholar-Athlete and a two-time Academic All-Big Ten selection.

Professional career
Bloom played two season with the Colorado Mammoth, before being traded to the Boston Blazers for current Colorado captain John Gallant.  Bloom joined the Boston Blazers for their inaugural season during the 2009 NLL season, and was named NLL Transition Player of the Week during 2009.  Bloom was traded in June 2009 to the Washington Stealth, and was named team captain shortly thereafter.  Bloom helped the Stealth win the 2010 NLL Championship, and is the youngest captain in the NLL to ever do so.  Has a young family and works in commercial real estate in Seattle for GVA Kidder Mathews.

Statistics

NLL

References

External links
 Ohio State Bio Page

Canadian lacrosse players
Colorado Mammoth players
Lacrosse people from British Columbia
Ohio State Buckeyes men's lacrosse players
Boston Blazers players
Living people
1982 births
People from Coquitlam